Dibrugarh Govt. Boys' Higher Secondary School was established in 1840 during the rule of British at Dibrugarh. It is the oldest high school in upper assam. It has been shifted many times due to damage done by the 1897 and 1950 earthquakes. Now the school is situated at Milan Nagar, Dibrugarh beside the district library and museum. There are 56 staff and around 1600 students. The language of instruction is Assamese. Students of the Govt. Boys appear for High School Leaving Certificate (class 10 exam) under the Board of Secondary Education, Assam and Higher Secondary School Leaving Certificate (equivalent to class 12) under Assam Higher Secondary Education Council.

References

Boys' schools in India
High schools and secondary schools in Assam
Dibrugarh
Educational institutions established in 1840
1840 establishments in British India